Jamie Feeney (born 9 April 1978) is the coach of the Gold Coast Titans NRLW team, and an Australian former rugby league footballer who played in the 1990s and 2000s.

Background
Born in Muswellbrook, New South Wales. Feeney was educated at Muswellbrook High School and then St Josephs High School, Aberdeen.

After graduating high school, Feeney attended university at Australian College of Physical Education. He studied a
Bachelor's degree in Personal Development, Health and Physical Education

Playing career
Feeney joined Canterbury in 1997 and won the reserve grade premiership with the club in 1998.  In 1999, Feeney made his first grade debut for Canterbury against Auckland.  

Over the coming years, Feeney became a regular in the Canterbury side but missed out on playing in the 2004 premiership winning team against the Sydney Roosters.  

In 2005, Feeney joined Melbourne Storm and played two seasons with the club. He was part of the extended bench for the club's 2006 NRL Grand Final loss against Brisbane.

Coaching career
In 2006, Feeney became coach of the Central Coast Jersey Flegg Cup team.  

He has previously been the NSWRL Performance Programs Manager, NRL NRL Elite Female Pathways Manager, and has been an assistant coach with the Jillaroos since 2016.

2020 
 
In June 2020, Feeney was appointed as head coach of the Sydney Roosters NRL Women's Premiership team, leading the team to the 2020 NRL Women's Grand Final, with his team losing 20-10 to Brisbane Broncos.

2021  

Feeney was replaced as Sydney Roosters coach in February 2021 after moving to Queensland.

On 14 June 2021, Feeney was announced as the inaugural coach of the Gold Coast Titans NRLW team, following the expansion of the competition for the 2021 season.

With Feeney as coach, the Titans made the 2021 NRL Women's season finals (competition held in 2022), after finishing third on the ladder. The Titans were eliminated from the finals by St George Illawarra Dragons.

Career highlights
Junior Club: Muswellbrook Rams
First Grade Debut: Round 12, Canterbury v Warriors at Telstra Stadium 23 May 1999

References

External links
Canterbury Bulldogs profile
Melbourne Storm profile
NRL profile

1978 births
Living people
Australian rugby league coaches
Australian rugby league players
Canterbury-Bankstown Bulldogs players
Melbourne Storm players
Country New South Wales Origin rugby league team players
Rugby league second-rows
Rugby league locks
Rugby league players from New South Wales